Economical Insurance, founded in 1871, is a   Canadian Property & Casualty insurance company, offering automobile, property, liability, agriculture, and surety insurance. Its executive offices are located in Waterloo, Ontario, with regional offices across Canada. The company has a 4.02% market share, measured by direct written premium in the Canadian Property & Casualty Insurance market as of December 2012. As of 2014, it had about 1.6 billion in mutual policyholder's equity. It is the 9th largest property and casualty insurance company in Canada, by direct written premium and the 20th largest insurance company in Canada, by total assets.

The firm owns several operating subsidiaries, the largest of which is Economical Mutual Insurance Company. Other member companies are Perth Insurance Company, Waterloo Insurance Company, The Missisquoi Insurance Company, and Federation Insurance Company of Canada.

History 

The company was established when a group of people in Berlin (now Kitchener), Ontario created a plan to protect themselves and their neighbours from the hardships caused by fire and lightning in 1871. On November 25, Economical Mutual Fire Insurance Company of Berlin issued its first policy on a house and barn.  In 1887 the company opened its headquarters on the main street of the Berlin.  One of the early directors of the company was Moses Springer, a Member of Parliament.

During World War I, the company became involved in controversy when its general manager, ex-mayor W. H. Schmaltz, opposed the renaming of the town of Berlin to Kitchener.

The company expanded over the years, both in terms of geography and type of products offered. In 1937, Economical expanded into Quebec by purchasing Merchant's Casualty Company of Waterloo. Ten years later, Economical expanded into the Maritimes through acquiring the Canadian operation of Northwestern Mutual Fire Insurance Association. Meanwhile, the company started to offer automobile, accident, and illness insurance in addition to property insurance.

Economical acquired The Missisquoi and Rouville Insurance Company of Quebec, The Perth Mutual of Stratford, Waterloo County Mutual Fire Insurance Company, the insurance-related assets of the Family Group of Companies of British Columbia, Federation Insurance, Hartford Insurance Company of Canada in 1956, 1968, 1980, 1999, 2000, and 2001 respectively. In 2006, The Mattei Companies of Seattle, Washington joined Economical Insurance, becoming the company's first subsidiary outside Canada.

Throughout these changes and additions, the company's headquarters remained in the same municipality, now the city of Kitchener-Waterloo.  By 2001, Economic Insurance Group was writing over one billion dollars in premiums annually. By 2014, this had increased to $2 billion.

Recent developments

In December 2010, the board of Economical Mutual Insurance Company announced its intention to pursue demutualization, which would mean that some of its policy holders would become shareholders.  It is the first Property & Casualty Insurance company in Canada to do this. However, as of 2014, the demutualization was temporarily on hold, pending finalization of new federal regulations governing this process. According to the Globe and Mail, the upcoming demutualization has made the company a potential target for takeover bids from other Canadian and international insurance companies.

In 2012 and 2013, Economical reduced its staff by laying off more than 280 of its employees.

The final vote to approve demutualization is slated for Spring 2021.

Awards and recognition 

Economical Insurance has been ranked in a Top 125 companies list in Training magazine for excellence in workforce learning and development in the year 2013.

On April 9, 2014, independent rating agency A.M. Best affirmed the financial strength and issuer credit rating of Economical Insurance as “A- (Excellent)”.

References

External links

Financial services companies established in 1871
Insurance companies of Canada
Mutual insurance companies
Companies based in Waterloo, Ontario
1871 establishments in Ontario